Matysiakowie (The Matysiaks) is one of the most popular Polish radio dramas. The series tells a story of a fictional Polish family, Matysiakowie, from Powiśle, Warsaw.

History
The programme debuted in 1956, and with one 25-minute episode every week on Saturdays it has continued until the present on Polskie Radio's Program 1, making it one of the longest-running radio dramas in the world. Episode 2600 was broadcast in December 2006, and Episode 2815 in January 2011. It is estimated that more than ten million Poles have listened to it.

The creator of the series and principal scriptwriter was Jerzy Janicki; other scriptwriters included Stanisław Stampf'l, Władysław Żesławski and Dżennet Półtorzycka. The series has featured many actors (over 250 since the show begun), including Jerzy Bończak, Tadeusz Fijewski, Mieczysława Ćwiklińska, Edmund Fetting, Stanisława Perzanowska, Krzysztof Chamiec, Mieczysław Czechowicz, Hanka Bielicka, Maciej Damięcki, Jan Englert and others. In recent years the series has also been distributed by Polskie Radio as a podcast.

For the first few years, Polskie Radio made no official announcements about the show, which led many to believe it was not a play, but a form of a reality show. Although the show's popularity has waned in recent years, it used to be the most popular radio drama in Poland (declared as such by the Centrum Badania Opinii Społecznej study in 1968 ), with an estimated 12 million listeners .

The Matysiaks family mirror many events from contemporary Polish history; however, despite being created during the People's Republic of Poland, it was not communist propaganda, or a mouthpiece for the government, one of the reasons which may explain the show's popularity. Created in December 1956, soon after the events of the Polish October, in the first episode that year, the family members were donating to a charity for for Hungarians. In addition, not a single family member has ever joined the Polish United Workers' Party. The show had to deal with censorship; for example, the censors forbade mentions of a church marriage in the 1970s. The show was also stopped for half a year during martial law in Poland in 1981.

For the most part, however, the series is concerned with everyday life issues: living on a small worker's wages and pension, children's education, local events in Warsaw, and so on. Big topics return every so often, such as discussion on the lustration. The series tries to distance itself from the image of a soap opera by concentrating on such issues, with few 'big events' or romance; only once during the entire history of the series has one of the main characters been considering an extra-marital affair. On some levels, the family is idealised as "the good guys", Polish patriots: their members fought in the siege of Warsaw (1939), the Warsaw Uprising of 1944 and even in the battle of Monte Cassino. The characters of the series age and die as in real life, their children grow up to replace them on the antenna. Their backgrounds change as the worker's family children receive higher education, and live in the modern Computer Age.

Because of its popularity, the show has also received gifts and donations from listeners. People involved with the Matysiakowie show helped organise such gestures of goodwill: a nursing home in the 1960s, a monument to Bolesław Prus in the 1970s, and to Ignacy Paderewski in the 1980s. Currently, they support the animal rights movement in Poland.

Notes

References
 Matysiakowie entry on Polskie Radio page
 Matysiakowie po pięćdziesiątce, Gazeta Wyborcza, 2007-01-04
 Matysiakowie po raz 2600, Gazeta Wyborcza, 2006-12-15 
 Matysiakowie: to już 50 lat
 Michał Grech,  

1956 radio programme debuts
Culture in Warsaw
Polish radio dramas
Polskie Radio
1956 radio dramas